Retro (or reverse) screening (RS) is a relatively new approach to determine the specificity and selectivity of a therapeutic drug molecule against a target protein or another macromolecule. It proceeds in the opposite direction to the so-called virtual screening (VS). In VS, the goal is to use a protein target to identify a high-affinity ligand from a search library typically containing hundreds of thousands of small molecules. In contrast, RS employs a known drug molecule to screen a protein library containing hundreds of thousands of individual structures (obtained from both experimental and modeling techniques). Accordingly, the extent to which this drug cross-reacts with the human proteome provides a measure of its efficacy and the potential long-term side-effects. RS is expected to play a key role in providing an additional layer of quality control in drug discovery.

Bioinformatics
Drug discovery
Cheminformatics
Alternatives to animal testing